is a Japanese actress. She made her screen debut in The Human Bullet while still a high school student, and became popular for her role in the NHK Asadora television programme  in 1969.

She published a collection of nude photos while pregnant. She has been married twice.

Filmography

Film

Television

References

External links

Japanese actresses
1950 births
Living people
Asadora lead actors
People from Tokyo
People from Tokyo Metropolis
Actresses from Tokyo